WikiToLearn was a collaborative, international, free knowledge project, run entirely by volunteers, and dedicated to creating free and accessible textbooks for higher education. In December 2013, it joined the KDE Project through its incubation process with multiple sponsors like Wikimedia Italia.

History 
WikiToLearn started as WikiFM in Milan by a group of science students from the University of Milan Bicocca on May 1, 2012. WikiFM was originally launched as a private wiki to exchange links, suggestions, and other information related to studying at the University of Milan Bicocca.

In May 2013 the website has been publicly announced using some money destined to student associations of the University of Milan Bicocca. For this historical reason, while the project has an international aim, the bulk of the oldest content is in Italian.

In September 2013 WikiFM received the sponsorship of Wikimedia Italia. In December 2013, WikiFM officially joined the KDE project, by entering, as first project, KDE's incubator program. It was later advertised by the KDE project as one of its most important success stories.

From WikiFM to WikiToLearn  
2015 has been the turning point for the project. The key event happened during KDE's annual conference, Akademy. In July 2015, Riccardo Iaconelli has given a speech on the WikiFM project in order to submit it to the attention of the international community. On this occasion, the website has enriched to accommodate multiple languages, to embrace a larger number of people using their native language.
Following the initial feedback, WikiFM was subsequently renamed to WikiToLearn. The project thus started to gather a more official attention from educational institutions. The first foundation interested in using WikiToLearn as a training/tutoring platform has been the High Energy Physics Software Foundation, which experimentally tried its own section on the English website.
Several professors from different institutions have subsequently started to collaborate on WikiToLearn, like CERN, HSF, and Fermilab.
In September 2015, the University of Milano-Bicocca became the first institution to officially back  the project, asking professors and students to populate the portal with educational content.

The project 
The goal of WikiToLearn is to provide free, collaborative and accessible textbooks for the whole world, with a focus on training and didactics. To reach this goal, the project relies on many volunteers' combined effort in the academic world.

Content are written by both students, who ideally start to create textbooks while studying the subject in question, and professors, who provide thorough fact-checking and accuracy.

Given the deep technical nature of the topics, there is a complex review and rating system under review  to try to measure the quality of the individual articles.

See also 

 Open textbooks
 Free High School Science Texts
 California Open Source Textbook Project

References

External links 
 WikiToLearn Homepage
 The launch talk at Akademy 2015
 Article on Wired Italia  

Textbooks
Open content